The 2019–20 Troy Trojans men's basketball team represented Troy University in the 2019–20 NCAA Division I men's basketball season. The Trojans, led by first-year head coach Scott Cross, played their home games at Trojan Arena in Troy, Alabama as members of the Sun Belt Conference. They finished the season 9–22, 5–15 in Sun Belt play to finish in a tie for 11th place. They failed to qualify for the Sun Belt tournament.

Previous season
The Trojans finished the 2018–19 season 12–18, 5–13 in Sun Belt play to finish in a tie for last place. They failed to qualify for the Sun Belt tournament.

On March 11, 2019, it was announced that head coach Phil Cunningham was relieved of his duties, ending his six-year tenure with the team. On March 26, TCU assistant and former UT Arlington head coach Scott Cross was announced as Troy's next head coach.

Roster

Schedule and results

|-
!colspan=12 style=| Non-conference regular season

|-
!colspan=9 style=| Sun Belt Conference regular season

|-

Source

References

Troy Trojans men's basketball seasons
Troy Trojans
Troy Trojans men's basketball
Troy Trojans men's basketball